Zeroth is a platform for brain-inspired computing from Qualcomm. It makes a form of machine learning known as deep learning available to mobile devices. It is used for image and sound processing, including speech recognition. The software operates locally rather than as a cloud application.

Mobile chip maker Qualcomm announced in March 2015 that it would bundle the software with its next major mobile device chip, the Snapdragon 820 processor.

Applications 

Qualcomm demonstrated that the system could recognize human faces and gestures that it had seen before and detect and then search for different types of photo scenes.

Another potential application is to extend battery life by analyzing phone usage and powering down all or part of its capabilities without affecting the user experience.

See also
 Neuromorphic computing
 TrueNorth
 SpiNNaker
 Vision processing unit, a class of processors aimed at machine vision (including convolutional neural networks, hence overlapping with 'neural processing units')

References 

Qualcomm software
Mobile software
Data mining and machine learning software
Image processing software
Speech recognition software
AI accelerators